Omalotheca is a genus of flowering plants in the daisy family. It is commonly known as arctic cudweed.

There is some disagreement about which species should be included in Omalotheca. Some or all of the species are sometimes included in Gnaphalium.

Species

Omalotheca afghanica (Rech.fil. & Köie) J.Holub - Afghanistan
Omalotheca norvegica  – Norwegian arctic cudweed - Europe, Russia (Asian and European), Central Asia, Xinjiang, Newfoundland, Labrador, Quebec, Greenland
Omalotheca stewartii (Clarke) J.Holub - India, Pakistan, Afghanistan, Turkey, Xinjiang, Yunnan
Omalotheca supina  – alpine arctic cudweed - Mongolia, Iran, Central Asia, Russia, Greenland, Labrador, Newfoundland, Quebec, Maine, New Hampshire
Omalotheca sylvatica  – woodland arctic cudweed - Europe, northern central and southwestern Asia, northern North America

References

Asteraceae genera
Gnaphalieae